Carex barbarae is a species of sedge known as Santa Barbara sedge.

Description
This sedge produces angled, hairless stems up to one meter tall or slightly taller, but not in clumps. The tough leaves are narrow with shredding, red-spotted or purple basal sheaths. The inflorescence produces erect and drooping spikes up to about 8 centimeters long with an associated long bract which exceeds the length of the spikes. The fruits are covered in a sac called a perigynium which is light to dark brown and sometimes red-spotted, leathery and tough, and sometimes with a toothed, hairy tip. The plant rarely matures into a fruiting stage, however, with most individuals remaining sterile.

Distribution and habitat
Santa Barbara sedge is native to the western United States, in California and Oregon. It grows in wet and seasonally wet habitat, such as meadows and riverbanks.

Uses
Parts of this sedge were used in basketry and as sewing fiber by California Native American groups such as the Maidu and Pomo.

References

External links
Jepson Manual Treatment
USDA Plants Profile
Photo gallery

barbarae
Flora of California
Flora of Oregon
Plants described in 1859
Flora without expected TNC conservation status